The Mighty Jungle may refer to:
 The Mighty Jungle (Canadian TV series), the 2007-2008 Canadian puppet series
 The Mighty Jungle (American TV series), the 1994 American sitcom